Redvale is an unincorporated town, a post office, and a census-designated place (CDP) located in and governed by Montrose County, Colorado, United States. The CDP is a part of the Montrose, CO Micropolitan Statistical Area. The Redvale post office has the ZIP Code 81431. At the 2020 census, the population of the Redvale CDP was 172, down from 236 in 2010.

Geography
Redvale is in southern Montrose County near the eastern end of the Colorado Plateau. The community is bordered to the south by San Miguel County. It sits atop Wrights Mesa, bordered by Naturita Canyon to the southwest and Maverick Draw to the northeast. Colorado State Highway 145 passes through the community, leading northwest  to Naturita and southeast  to Norwood.

The community is in the watershed of the San Miguel River, leading northwest to the Dolores River which flows into the Colorado River in Utah.

Demographics

See also

Outline of Colorado
Index of Colorado-related articles
State of Colorado
Colorado cities and towns
Colorado census designated places
Colorado counties
Montrose County, Colorado
Colorado metropolitan areas
Montrose, CO Micropolitan Statistical Area

References

External links

Redvale @ Colorado.com
Redvale @ UncoverColorado.com
Redvale, Colorado Mining Claims And Mines
Montrose County website

Unincorporated communities in Montrose County, Colorado
Unincorporated communities in Colorado